Yessica Paz (born ) is a Venezuelan female volleyball player. She was part of the Venezuela women's national volleyball team.

She competed with the national team at the 2008 Summer Olympics in Beijing,  China.
She played with Aragua in 2008.

Clubs
  Aragua (2008)

See also
 Venezuela at the 2008 Summer Olympics

References

External links

1989 births
Living people
Olympic volleyball players of Venezuela
Place of birth missing (living people)
Venezuelan women's volleyball players
Volleyball players at the 2008 Summer Olympics
20th-century Venezuelan women
21st-century Venezuelan women